Rantasalmi is a municipality of Finland.
is water.

Neighbouring municipalities are Joroinen, Juva, Savonlinna, Sulkava and Varkaus.

The municipality is unilingually Finnish.

Some villages
Asikkala, Osikonmäki, Putkisalo, Rantasalo, Torasalo, Tornioniemi, Tuusmäki and Vaahersalo.

Notable people
Eliel Saarinen (1873–1950), a Finnish–American architect was born in Rantasalmi.
Laura Netzel (1839-1927), pianist, composer and conductor
Jukka Lehtonen (born 1982), volleyball player
Jarkko Immonen (born 1982), ice hockey player
Lauri Kaukonen (1902-1975), Secretariate Counsellor

References

External links

Municipality of Rantasalmi – Official website 

 
Populated places established in 1578